The 2021 NASCAR Xfinity Series Championship Race was a NASCAR Xfinity Series race held on November 6, 2021. It was contested over 200 laps on the  oval. It was the thirty-third and final race of the 2021 NASCAR Xfinity Series season, as well as the championship race.

Report

Background
Phoenix Raceway – also known as PIR – is a one-mile, low-banked tri-oval race track located in Avondale, Arizona. It is named after the nearby metropolitan area of Phoenix. The motorsport track opened in 1964 and currently hosts two NASCAR race weekends annually. PIR has also hosted the IndyCar Series, CART, USAC and the Rolex Sports Car Series. The raceway is currently owned and operated by International Speedway Corporation.

The raceway was originally constructed with a 2.5 mi (4.0 km) road course that ran both inside and outside of the main tri-oval. In 1991 the track was reconfigured with the current 1.51 mi (2.43 km) interior layout. PIR has an estimated grandstand seating capacity of around 67,000. Lights were installed around the track in 2004 following the addition of a second annual NASCAR race weekend.

Entry list 

 (R) denotes rookie driver.
 (i) denotes driver who is ineligible for series driver points.

Practice 

Qualifying
Landon Cassill, Stephen Leicht, Spencer Boyd, Ryan Ellis, Timmy Hill, and Joey Gase failed to qualify.

Qualifying results

Race

Race results

Stage Results 
Stage One
Laps: 45

Stage Two
Laps: 45

Final Stage Results 

Laps: 110
After 120 Xfinity Series starts, Daniel Hemric would come home to win at Phoenix. Additionally, he scored the championship as well.

Race statistics 

 Lead changes: 16 among 5 different drivers
 Cautions/Laps: 10 for 61
 Time of race: 2 hours, 22 minutes, and 35 seconds
 Average speed:

References 

NASCAR races at Phoenix Raceway
2021 in sports in Arizona
NASCAR Xfinity Series Championship Race
2021 NASCAR Xfinity Series